Gaza may refer to:

Places

Palestine 
 Gaza Strip, a Palestinian territory on the eastern coast of the Mediterranean Sea
 Gaza City, a city in the Gaza Strip
 Gaza Governorate, a governorate in the Gaza Strip

Lebanon
 Ghazzeh, a village in the Western Beqaa District

United States 
 Gaza, Iowa, an unincorporated community
 Gaza, a village in the town of Sanbornton, New Hampshire
 Little Gaza, an Arab-American ethnic enclave in Anaheim, California
 Gaza Strip, colloquial name for Anaheim Island, California, unincorporated area in Orange County, California

Australia 
 Klemzig, South Australia, renamed Gaza from 1917 to 1935

Africa
 Gaza Empire, a former Nguni kingdom in southern Africa
 Gaza Province, a province of Mozambique
 Gazaland, a region in southern Mozambique and Zimbabwe

History and society
 Gaza people, a Nguni people in southern Africa
 Gaza (Battle honour), a British World War I award
 Gaza Thesis, a thesis used to explain the rise of the Ottoman Empire

Popular culture
 Gaza (band), a mathcore band from Salt Lake City, Utah
 Gaza (film), a 2019 Irish documentary film about the Gaza strip in Palestine
 Sektor Gaza, Russian punk rock band from Voronezh (1987–2000)
 "Gaza", a 2012 song by progressive rock band Marillion
 Gaza, warrior from Sol in the Sony PlayStation game, Legend of Legaia
 "Gaza", an episode of the television program The West Wing (season 5)

Science
 Gaza (gastropod), a genus of sea snails

People
 Porphyry of Gaza (347–420), Bishop of Gaza 395–420
 Choricius of Gaza (c. 500), Greek sophist and rhetorician
 Gaza Triad, three 6th Century Christian theologians from Gaza city
 Aeneas of Gaza (d. 518), Neo-Platonic philosopher
 Procopius of Gaza (465–528), Christian sophist and rhetorician
 Zacharias Rhetor (d. before 553)
 Dorotheus of Gaza (505–565), Christian abbot
 Theodorus Gaza (1400–1475), Greek humanist
 Nathan of Gaza (1643–1680), Jewish theologian

See also
 Gazza (disambiguation)
 Ghazi (warrior)